Bruno Jerebicnik (born 11 July 1947) is an Austrian modern pentathlete. He competed at the 1972 Summer Olympics.

References

1947 births
Living people
Austrian male modern pentathletes
Olympic modern pentathletes of Austria
Modern pentathletes at the 1972 Summer Olympics